Parmotrema upretii is a species of saxicolous (rock-dwelling), foliose lichen in the family Parmeliaceae. Found in India, it was described as new to science in 2003 by Pradeep Divakar. The species epithet honours Indian lichenologist Dalip Kumar Upreti, who collected the type specimen.

Description

The margins are smooth and lack . The upper surface is mineral grey in color, smooth, without any visible spots or marks, and has a lobulate-isidiate texture. The  are present on the lamina, and in some cases, near the margins. Initially, they are granular and have black tips, resembling isidia. However, they soon become flat, and horizontal. The size of the lobules can be up to 1.5 mm in width and 1 mm in height, with more or less dichotomously divided margins and no cilia. The medulla is white, around 75–100 μm thick. The lower surface is black and smooth. The margin of the lower surface measures approximately 4–6 mm wide and has a shiny, rhizine-free, pale brown zone. The center of the lower surface is sparsely rhizinate, and the rhizines are black, and up to 1 mm long, present in the center. There is no visible sign of apothecia and pycnidia.

Atranorin and gyrophoric acid are two lichen products that occur in Parmotrema upretii. The expected results of chemical spot tests are K+ (yellow) in the cortex, and K−, C+ (red), KC+ (red) and P− in the medulla.

Habitat and distribution

In addition to Himachal Pradesh, it has also been recorded in Madhya Pradesh.

See also
List of Parmotrema species

References

upretii
Lichen species
Lichens described in 2003
Lichens of India
Taxa named by Pradeep Kumar Divakar